Steyer may refer to:

 Steyer (name), people with the surname
 Tom Steyer (born 1957), American asset manager, philanthropist and environmentalist
 Steyer Opera House, a historic building in Decorah, Iowa, United States
 Steyer Bridge, a historic structure in Decorah, Iowa, United States
 Heinz-Steyer-Stadion, a football and athletics stadium in Dresden, Germany

See also
 Steyr (disambiguation)